Fraine is a comune and town in the province of Chieti, Abruzzo, southern Italy.

References

Cities and towns in Abruzzo